Ivo Georgiev (12 May 1972 – 13 November 2021) was a Bulgarian professional footballer who played as a forward.

Career
In his career Georgiev played for Volov Shumen, Debreceni VSC, Korabostroitel, Spartak Varna, FC Aarau, Levski Sofia, SV Waldhof Mannheim, Dobrudzha, Budapest Honvéd and Botev Vratsa.

In season 1995-96 Georgiev scored six goals for Spartak Varna in a Bulgarian league match against Spartak Plovdiv. In the same season he became top scorer of the league, scoring 21 goals.

For the Bulgaria national football team he was in roster for UEFA Euro 1996. He was capped once, scoring in his sole game.

Death
Georgiev died from heart failure on 13 November 2021, at the age of 49.

Career statistics
Scores and results list Bulgaria's goal tally first, score column indicates score after each Georgiev goal.

References

External links
 

1972 births
2021 deaths
Bulgarian footballers
Association football forwards
Bulgaria international footballers
UEFA Euro 1996 players
Debreceni VSC players
PFC Spartak Varna players
PFC Levski Sofia players
PFC Dobrudzha Dobrich players
FC Aarau players
SV Waldhof Mannheim players
Budapest Honvéd FC players
FC Botev Vratsa players
Nemzeti Bajnokság I players
First Professional Football League (Bulgaria) players
Swiss Super League players
Footballers from Sofia
Bulgarian expatriate footballers
Bulgarian expatriate sportspeople in Hungary
Expatriate footballers in Hungary
Bulgarian expatriate sportspeople in Germany
Expatriate footballers in Germany
Bulgarian expatriate sportspeople in Switzerland
Expatriate footballers in Switzerland